Joseph Algerine Odom (March 22, 1948 – November 2, 1991) was an American attorney who later became a musician. He came to prominence after his appearance as one of the main characters in John Berendt's true-crime book Midnight in the Garden of Good and Evil, although he died three years before its publication.

Early life
Odom was born in Claxton, Georgia, on March 22, 1948. He later moved to Savannah, where he was a "ne'er-do-well" attorney.

Death
Odom died on November 2, 1991, from complications of AIDS. He was 43, and was living at the time in an apartment inside Savannah's Hamilton–Turner Inn, which Nancy Hillis purchased in 1991. He is buried, in a family plot in Bull Creek Cemetery in his hometown of Claxton, beside his father, Herman (1921–1995), and mother, Gwendolyn (1920–2013). After the death of her husband of 56 years, Gwendolyn was married to Aubrey Strickland until her death in 2013.

Midnight in the Garden of Good and Evil
In John Berendt's book Midnight in the Garden of Good and Evil, Odom was portrayed as the love interest of Mandy Nichols; however, Nancy Hillis, upon whom Nichols was based, has stated that there was no romantic relationship between her and Odom, who was "not strictly heterosexual." They performed music together only and owned a bar, Sweet Georgia Brown's, in Savannah's City Market. (Odom was also friends with and a business partner of Emma Kelly, dubbed by Johnny Mercer as the "lady of six-thousand songs", who also appears in the book.) Hillis also said that, contrary to what Berendt wrote, she and Odom did not meet until Odom had moved from 16 East Jones Street in Savannah to 101 East Oglethorpe Avenue, a three-storey townhouse at the corner of Drayton Street. From there, he moved to Pulaski Square.

Odom died three years before the book's 1994 release. Hillis died in 2016, aged 67, after a five-year battle with ALS.

Odom was portrayed by Paul Hipp in Clint Eastwood's 1997 movie adaptation.

References

External links
Joseph Algerine Odom at FindAGrave.com

1948 births
1991 deaths
People from Claxton, Georgia
21st-century American pianists
AIDS-related deaths in Georgia (U.S. state)
20th-century American lawyers